Expert Review of Cardiovascular Therapy is a monthly peer-reviewed medical journal covering all aspects of cardiology. It was established in 2003 and is published by Informa. The journal is abstracted and indexed in Index Medicus/MEDLINE/PubMed, Embase/Excerpta Medica, EMCare, Chemical Abstracts, Scopus, and CINAHL.

External links 
 

Cardiology journals
English-language journals
Expert Review journals
Monthly journals
Publications established in 2003